The Catholic University College of Ghana is one of the private universities in Ghana. It is located at Fiapre, Sunyani in the Bono Region. It was granted accreditation by the National Accreditation Board on 4 December 2002. The first batch of students started on 3 March 2003. The formal inauguration of the university was on 13 November 2003.

Organization

Departments

Faculty of Economics and Business Administration (EBA)
 Department of Economics
 Department of Accounting and Finance
 Department of Management
 Entrepreneurship and Innovative Center
Faculty of Education
 Department of Arts and Education
 Department of Social Science Education
 Department of Science and Mathematics Education

Faculty of Information and Communication Sciences & Technology (ICST)
 Department of Computing and Information Sciences
 Department of Decision Sciences and Applied Mathematics
 Department of Communication Sciences and Multi-Media Studies

Faculty of Health and Allied Sciences (HAS)
 Department of Public Health
 Department of Nursing
 Department of Applied Sciences

Faculty of Religions and Social Sciences (RSS)
 Department of Religious Studies
 Department of Social Sciences
 Department of Languages

Faculty of Economic and Business Administration
This faculty runs programmes leading to the award of the following degrees.
Bsc Accounting
BSc Banking and Finance
BSc Economics
Bsc Human Resource Management
BSc Management
BSc Management and Organisational Development
Bsc Marketing
BSc Procurement and Supply Chain Management

POSTGRADUATE PROGRAMS
MBA Accounting 
MBA Finance 
MBA Human Resource Management 
MBA Marketing

Faculty of Information and Communication Sciences and Technology
This faculty has produced four-year programmes leading to a
 Bsc in Actuarial Science
 BSc in Computer Science.
 Bsc in Information Technology
 Bsc in Mathematics with Economics

Faculty of Religions and Social Sciences
BA Religious Studies
Certificate in English Language 
Certificate in French Language
M.A Religious Studies and Pastoral Ministry

Faculty of Health and Allied Sciences
This faculty has produced four-year programmes leading to a 
 Bsc in General Nursing
 BSc in Public Health ( Health Management Option, Health Informatics Option, Health Education Option)
 Mphil Public Health
 Msc Public Health

Faculty of Education
Bachelor of Education in Accounting (BEd Accounting)
Bachelor of Education in English (BEd English)
Bachelor of Education in Computer Science (BEd Computer Science)
Bachelor of Education in Geography (BEd Geography)
Bachelor of Education in Mathematics (BEd Mathematics)
Bachelor of Education in Religious Studies (BEd Religious Studies)
Diploma in Basic Education for Non-Degree holders
One-Year Postgraduate Diploma in Education (PGDE) for Degree Holders
Post-graduate Diploma in Education

The Centre for Applied Research, Consultancy and Community Outreach
The centre promotes research within the university and be a creative link with the local communities.

Affiliations
The university has a number of affiliations with other educational institutions.
University of Ghana 
University of Cape Coast, Ghana
Boston College, Boston, Massachusetts, USA 
Catholic University of America, Washington, DC, USA
Saint Mary's University, Halifax, Nova Scotia, Canada

See also
List of universities in Ghana

Notes

External links
Official Website

Catholic universities and colleges in Ghana
Educational institutions established in 2003
2003 establishments in Ghana